Dyonathan Celestrino (born 1992), known as The Cross Maniac (Portuguese: Maníaco da Cruz), is a Brazilian serial killer who committed three ritualistic murders in Rio Brilhante from July to October 2008, when he was still a teenager. Due to the high probability of him posing a future danger to society, he remains incarcerated.

Murders 
In 2008, Celestrino, a religious goth, decided to kill those whom he perceived as "not following God's precepts." He would pick his victims at random and ask them various sexually-related questions, and if he considered them impure, he would proceed to kill them. After murdering his respective victim, Celestrino would undress them, spread their arms and cross the legs at ankle height to resemble a cross.

Victims 
Catalino Gardena, 33, killed on July 2 - a bricklayer and neighbor of Celestrino. He later claimed that Gardena "deserved to die" because he was an alcoholic and a homosexual.

Letícia Neves de Oliveira, 22, killed on August 24 - a lesbian gas station attendant. Found in a grave in a cemetery.

Gleice Kelly da Silva, 13, killed on October 3 - a drug user. Found half-naked at a construction site, her killer had left a handwritten note next to the body stating "dead man does not respond to messages".

Investigation 
After the murder of Da Silva, a special unit was formed to investigate her and the two previous murders, which were linked via a similar modus operandi. As part of the investigation procedures, officers interviewed Celestrino as he was Gardena's neighbor, but was only arrested on October 9, after a comment made on Da Silva's Orkut account, posted by a user named 'Cachorro do Inferno 666' (Dog of Hell 666), was linked back to him. They then obtained a search warrant for his house, where they found a knife, personal items belonging to De Oliveira and Da Silva and a piece of paper with the names of the victims and the date of the murders.

In the aftermath of his arrest, investigator Maria de Lourdes Souza Cano issued a press statement commending her colleagues' work effort in capturing the criminal. She also claimed that Celestrino had apparently planned to commit a fourth murder and seemingly aimed to surpass Francisco de Assis Pereira in notoriety.

Trial and imprisonment 
Soon after his arrest, Celestrino was ordered to undergo a psychiatric evaluation. The results from the evaluation concluded that he had an antisocial personality disorder and chronic psychopathy, due to which he was prescribed medication. He was then transferred to the Campo Grande Penal Institution, where he soon gained further notoriety for assaulting prison guards and having occasional outbursts.

Under Brazilian law, Celestrino was scheduled to be released in 2013 at the age of 21, but as he was deemed incapable of living a normal life, his sentence was extended indefinitely. While awaiting the final decision in his case, Celestrino managed to escape prison and flee to Horqueta, Paraguay on March 3, but was arrested only a month later on April 27 after a person residing at the same hotel recognized him.

As of August 2022, Celestrino remains incarcerated at the Campo Grande Penal Institution. He is described as a good inmate, is currently studying for a degree in environmental resource management and receives regular visits from family members. He has attempted to appeal various convictions from various charges committed in prison, most of which have been unsuccessful.

See also
 List of serial killers by country

References 

1992 births
21st-century Brazilian criminals
Brazilian murderers of children
Brazilian people convicted of murder
Brazilian serial killers
Crimes involving Satanism or the occult
Lesbophobic violence
Living people
Male serial killers
Minors convicted of murder
People convicted of murder by Brazil
People with antisocial personality disorder
People from Mato Grosso do Sul
Violence against gay men
Violence against women in Brazil